Victor Tubbax (11 February 1882 – 24 October 1974) was a Belgian cyclist. Competing as amateur he won the national championships and finished in second place in the UCI Motor-paced World Championships in 1906 and 1907. He turned professional in 1910.

References

1882 births
1974 deaths
Belgian male cyclists
People from Deurne, Belgium
Cyclists from Antwerp